Sigríður Anna Þórðardóttir (born 14 May 1946) is an Icelandic politician and former Minister for the Environment.

References 
 Biography

Sigridur Anna Thordardottir
1946 births
Living people
Sigridur Anna Thordardottir
Sigridur Anna Thordardottir